Ildikó Tóth (born 23 April 1987, Budapest) is a Hungarian female water polo player. At the 2012 Summer Olympics, she competed for the Hungary women's national water polo team in the women's event. She is 5 ft 9 inches tall.

See also
 List of World Aquatics Championships medalists in water polo

References

External links
 

Hungarian female water polo players
1987 births
Living people
Olympic water polo players of Hungary
Water polo players at the 2012 Summer Olympics
Water polo players at the 2016 Summer Olympics
World Aquatics Championships medalists in water polo
Water polo players from Budapest
20th-century Hungarian women
21st-century Hungarian women